David Brent Adams (born June 26, 1952) is a former American football offensive tackle in the National Football League who played for the Atlanta Falcons. He played college football for the Chattanooga Mocs.

References

1952 births
Living people
American football offensive tackles
Atlanta Falcons players
Chattanooga Mocs football players
Players of American football from Georgia (U.S. state)